Saint-Pierre-sur-Doux (literally Saint-Pierre on Doux; Vivaro-Alpine: Sant Pèire) is a commune in the Ardèche department in southern France. It lies on the river Doux.

Population

See also
Communes of the Ardèche department

References

Communes of Ardèche
Ardèche communes articles needing translation from French Wikipedia